The River Ouaka is a tributary of the Ubangi River in the Central African Republic, itself a tributary of the Congo River, and runs through Bambari, the capital of Ouaka Prefecture.

See also
 List of rivers of the Central African Republic

References

Rivers of the Central African Republic
Tributaries of the Ubangi River